A Description of the methods adopted by the Duke Valentino when murdering Vitellozzo Vitelli, Oliverotto da Fermo, the Signor Pagolo, and the Duke di Gravina Orsini often abbreviated as The Description for reasons of brevity, is a work by Italian Renaissance political scientist and historian Niccolò Machiavelli. The work describes the methods used by Cesare Borgia to suppress and murder members of the Orsini family, a princely family of Renaissance Rome. Both Vitellozzo Vitelli and Oliverotto da Fermo were strangled on the night of their capture on 31 December 1502.

References

External links
E-book text

Works by Niccolò Machiavelli
1503 books